Chris St. Croix (born May 2, 1979) is an American former ice hockey defenseman. He last played in the Central Hockey League during the 2009–10 CHL season with the Bossier-Shreveport Mudbugs.

St. Croix has been a resident of Voorhees Township, New Jersey. His father is former NHL goaltender Rick St. Croix and his younger brother is Edmonton Oil Kings forward Michael St. Croix.

St. Croix was drafted by the Calgary Flames in the 4th round of the 1997 NHL Entry Draft, but did not play in the NHL.

St. Croix resides in Winnipeg.

Career statistics

References

External links

1979 births
Living people
American men's ice hockey defensemen
Bossier-Shreveport Mudbugs players
Calgary Flames draft picks
Columbia Inferno players
Elmira Jackals (ECHL) players
Hartford Wolf Pack players
Ice hockey players from New Jersey
Iowa Stars players
Kamloops Blazers players
Las Vegas Wranglers players
Manitoba Moose players
People from Voorhees Township, New Jersey
Saint John Flames players
Sportspeople from the Delaware Valley